= Post-demographics =

Post-demographics is a way to study the personal data in social networking platforms, and, in particular, how profiling is, or may be, performed, with which findings as well as consequences. The prefix 'post' shows that it is different from the demographic data that tries to organize groups, markets and voters in society. Where of interests are not the traditional demographics of race, ethnicity, age, income, educational level or derivations thereof such as class, but rather tastes and other information supplied to make and maintain an online profile. From a post-demographics perspective, the profile lies at the core of research into social networking sites, as it provides information that moves beyond the demographic, organized according to ‘interested’ and ‘favorites’, with more specific sub-categories as brands, music, movies, animals, etc.

== Method ==
The object of study are social networking sites, which are defined as sites where users can create a profile and connect that profile to other profiles for the purposes of making an explicit personal network.

Instead of user-participation, observation, surveying as well as other approaches imported from the social sciences, the post-demographic methods depart from a non-user perspective. A non-user perspective is someone who does not use the social networking site to manage friendships or to flirt, but still visit the site and read the profiles. They are particularly interested in the data sets that they can retrieve from profiles.

The post-demographic method strives to think through what the profilers would do, and builds upon it. Thus, first it is important to identify the constraints per social networking platform in harvesting data. Once data may be harvested, the further step is to identify the set of relationships that could be studied, e.g., do friends have the same interests? The method tries to understand for which purposes are interests a more significant mode of organizing and recommending action than demographics.
